Roman Kanafotskyi (4 February 1938 – 9 April 2021) was a Ukrainian professional football administrator and player.

Playing and chairman career
Born in Horodok, Western Ukraine, Kanafotskyi was a product of the local youth sportive school. His first trained was S. Nyrko. He made his professional career in the different football teams of the Ukrainian SSR.

Since 1972 he worked as an administrator with Dnipro Dnipropetrovsk and after that, with SC Dnipro-1.

Death
Kanafotskyi  died on 9 April 2021 at the age of 83.

References

1938 births
2021 deaths
People from Horodok, Lviv Oblast
Soviet footballers
Ukrainian footballers
Association football defenders
Soviet Top League players
FC Avanhard Ternopil players
FC Naftovyk Drohobych players
FC Dnipro players
FC Kryvbas Kryvyi Rih players
FC Elektrometalurh-NZF Nikopol players
Ukrainian football chairmen and investors